The Conrad Schlumberger Award is an award given to one of the members of European Association of Geoscientists and Engineers. The award is given each year to one that has made an outstanding contribution over a period of time to the scientific and technical advancement of the geosciences, particularly geophysics. The award is made annually by the EAGE Board.

History
The Conrad Schlumberger Award was created in 1955, as a recognition of Conrad Schlumberger's outstanding contribution to exploration geophysics, by the European Association of Geoscientists and Engineers (then named The European Association of Exploration Geophysicists.)

List of recipients
Source:EAGE
 2020 André Revil
 2019 Andrey Bakulin
 2018 Johan Robertsson and Phil Christie
 2017 José Carcione
 2016 Stewart Greenhalgh
 2015 Alain Tabbagh
 2014 Valentina Socco
 2013 Kees Wapenaar
 2012 Martin Landrø
 2011 Sergey Fomel
 2010 Lasse Amundsen
 2009 Gerhard Pratt
 2008 Clive McCann
 2007 Colin Macbeth
 2006 Petar Stavrev
 2005 Horst Rüter
 2004 Eric de Bazelaire
 2003 Tariq Alkhalifah
 2002 M. Tygel
 2001 R. Marschall
 From June 2001, award dates refer to the year in which the award was presented and not to the year in which the winning poster/paper was presented.
 1999 Peter Weidelt
 1998 Vlastislav Cerveny
 1997 Jacob T. Fokkema
 1996 Michael Schoenberg
 1995 Patrick Lailly
 1994 P. Newman
 1993 Bjørn Ursin
 1992 L. Dresen
 1991 Oz Yilmaz
 1990 Fabio Rocca
 1989 Albert Tarantola
 1988 Ken Larner
 1987 Les Hatton
 1986 S. Crampin
 1985 S.M. Deregowski
 1984 K. Helbig
 1983 Johann Sattlegger
 1982 Anton Ziolkowski
 1981 W.E. Lerwill
 1980 A.J. "Guus" Berkhout
 1979 Theodore Krey
 1978 No award
 1977 Peter Hubral
 1976 J.G. (Mendel) Hagedoorn
 1975 Milo M. Backus and R.L. Chen
 1974 N. de Voogd
 1973 Roy E. White
 1972 P. Bois
 1971 P.N.S. O'Brien
 1970 H. Naudy
 1969 Sven Treitel and Enders A. Robinson
 1968 Helmut Linsser
 1967 Robert Garotta and Dominique Michon
 1966 Jacques D'Hoeraene
 1965 O. Koefoed
 1964 Nigel Anstey
 1963 G. Grau
 1962 No award
 1961 G. Kunetz
 1960 Reinhard Bortfeld
 1959 L. Alfano
 1958 Umberto Colombo
 1957 O. Kappelmeyer
 1956 No award
 1955 H. Flathe

See also
 List of geophysicists
 List of geophysics awards
 Prizes named after people

References

External links
 The Conrad Schlumberger Award homepage at EAGE
 All awards by EAGE
 EAGE (European Association of Geoscientists and Engineers) homepage

Science and technology awards
Awards established in 1955
1955 establishments in Europe